The cherry-throated tanager (Nemosia rourei) is a medium-sized passerine bird. This critically endangered tanager is an endemic to handful of localities in the Atlantic Forest in Espírito Santo, Brazil, though the possibility that it occurs in adjacent parts of Minas Gerais and Rio de Janeiro cannot be discounted. It has a striking, essentially black-white-red plumage; a photo is online in the abstract of Bauer et al. 1998.

Description
After Cabanis (1870), Bauer et al. (2000), Venturini et al. (2005):

The upper side is ashy grey, with a darker back and a lighter top of the head. A wide black mask extends from the forehead across the eyes, nearly meeting again at the nape; a small white line runs above it, and thus the forehead appears white when seen from the front. The wings and the square-tipped tail are black, with blue iridescence on the primary and secondary wing-coverts, and a striped patch formed by the light grey outer web of the tertiary remiges, with the grey scapulars sometimes dropping over the wings to form a grey shoulder patch. The uppertail coverts are likewise black, quite long, and have white tips that may have a signal function as they are sometimes prominently presented by the birds. The belly is white, and the throat has a patch of cherry red that varies in extent, in some birds reaching onto the breast. The feet and toenails are dull pink, and the iris is dark yellow.

Males and females probably look much alike, though it may be that the latter have a smaller red throat patch on average. Juveniles apparently have the throat patch dull brown.

In the field, the cherry-throated tanager is only likely to be confused with the rather common Paroaria cardinal-tanagers which have a similar color pattern when seen from a distance. At close range however, the distribution of black in N. roureis plumage is distinctive.

The type specimen is 14 cm (5,5 inch) long, with wings of 8,3 cm (3,25 in) and a tail of about 6 cm (2,4 in) length. Its bill is 1 cm (0,4 in) long along the ridge, 1,5 cm (0,6 in) long along the gape, and the tarsometatarsus (lower "leg") measures about 1,9 cm (0,75 in). A specimen banded in 1998 was smaller, at 12,5 cm (c. 5 in); its bill was 5,5 mm (0,22 in) high and 5 mm (0,2 in) wide and it weighed 22 g (0,78 oz).

Vocalizations
The cherry-throated tanager has a clear, far-carrying call, at 5-6 kHz. This note is given singly, or in a row of 2-3 in rapid succession. In the latter case, it is often followed by 2 slightly higher-pitched (8 kHz) notes; an entire 5-note sequence takes a mere second for the bird to utter. There is a kind of song, which consists of the same notes as the call does, interspersed with a more rapid chittering (Bauer et al. 2000).

Discovery, disappearance, and rediscovery
The bird was described in 1870 from a single specimen, an adult male shot by naturalist Jean de Roure and sent by Carl Euler to describer Jean Cabanis, who gave it its scientific name honoring the collector. At the time its discovery, the bird was neither known to the veteran collector de Roure, nor to anyone else Euler asked about it. The type specimen was deposited in the Berlin Museum für Naturkunde where it still resides (specimen MNHB 20326), luckily surviving the destruction of much of the MNHB collection in World War II.

There is some dispute about the type locality; Euler gives "Muriahié" (Muriaé) at the northern bank of the Paraíba do Sul, Minas Gerais (Cabanis 1870), but Pacheco (1999) argued for Macaé de Cima ("Macahé" in the late 19th century) near Nova Friburgo, Rio de Janeiro state as this was where de Roure's other bird specimens were collected. In addition, neither altitude nor habitat around Muriaé seem to agree with what is known about the species' ecology. This requires final confirmation though, as some patches of forest at the correct altitude seem to remain around Pico do Itajuru between Muriaé and Rosário de Limeira (Venturini et al. 2005), and it is possible that the bird once occurred in the lowlands and now is restricted to higher regions simply because only there suitable habitat still exists. Based on Pacheco's arguments, the Macaé de Cima area was searched, and habitat was found to be ample in Parque Estadual dos Três Picos, though no evidence of birds was found (Venturini et al. 2005). In any case, all but one recent records have come from Espírito Santo state.

The bird essentially remained known only from this single specimen for more than 100 years. Emilia Snethlage around 1926 mentions a probable pair in the Museu Nacional do Rio de Janeiro and indeed, "Nemosia rourii" appears in an 1876 collection catalog (Bauer et al. 2000). So it seems that two more birds were shot between 1870 and 1876 by de Roure, or by an undetermined collector at an unknown date before 1876, possibly even before 1870. In 1940 however these could not be located anymore (Schneider fide Pacheco & Bauer 1995). Helmut Sick on August 8, 1941, observed a group of 8 near Itarana, but no further action was taken; Sick, later to become one of the foremost experts on Neotropical ornithology, had only arrived in Brazil two years earlier, and knew little if anything about N. rourei (which was not usually mentioned in the ornithological literature). It was not until his examination of the type specimen in 1976 that he realized what he had seen 35 years earlier (Sick 1979, 119).

On October 5, 1995, a bird matching the species' description was observed in a mixed-species feeding flock at Augusto Ruschi Biological Reserve (formerly Nova Lombardia B.R.), where the species was already hypothesized to be present given the suitable habitat (Scott 1997).

Another possible sighting on July 17, 1994, was at Fazenda Pedra Bonita, north of Pirapetinga in Minas Gerais, but the possibility of a confusion with a Paroaria cardinal-tanager cannot be excluded, as the bird sketched by the observers in the field had too little dark on the head. In any case, no such bird was again encountered there during several later searches, and the area seems to be too low-lying, only some 150–230 m ASL (Venturini et al. 2005).

The theory that cherry-throated tanagers are hybrids between hooded and rufous-headed tanagers (Sibley 1996) was discussed by Scott (1997) who tentatively rejected it, but some even were convinced that the type specimen is an artifact composed from skins of other species (Silveira fide Bauer et al. 2000). The field data gathered since then supports the validity of the species, which was definitely rediscovered on February 22, 1998, at the Fazenda Pindobas IV, a privately owned tract of woodland NW of Conceição do Castelo (Bauer et al. 1998, Pacheco 1998).

On September 12, 2003, the species' presence was also confirmed in Caetés Forest, some  N of Vargem Alta. It has been observed with some regularity at both that locality and Fazenda Pindobas IV, though it is always elusive and usually unpredictable in its movements (but see below). Once encountered, birds can be attracted for identification by taped calls of the species. The presence of a population in the larger tracts of habitat at the Augusto Ruschi Biological Reserve - the only known habitat under protection at present - is strongly suspected. A number of other forests where populations may occur have been identified around Itarana (Barra Encoberta, Alto Jatibocas, Alto Santa Maria, Alto Santa Joana), Santa Maria de Jetibá (Plantojo, Simão, Sabino, Cristal, Garrafão and near the Rio Bonito dam), Domingos Martins (Chapéu and Paraju), Brejetuba and Muniz Freire, and at the Rio Fundo near Marechal Floriano; there are some indications that the species is present in at least 3 of these localities, while one of those near Santa Maria de Jetibá, was destroyed in 2004 by illegal logging (Venturini et al. 2005).

Despite several searches, the cherry-throated tanager was not found in suitable habitat outside Espírito Santo state (Venturini et al. 2005).

In January and again in November 2019 two birds were seen at the Águia Branca Private Reserve, an area of 17 km2 protected since 2017. On the 3rd and 11th of June 2020, G. S. de Oliveira observed 5 individuals feeding along forest edge on Santi Pizzol's farm which borders Águia Branca Private Reserve, and photographed some. 

Ecology
The verified records of the species were all at altitudes of 850–1,250 m ASL in Atlantic Dense Montane Rainforest ecotone; whether the altitude range reflects restriction of habitat or genuine preference is not known. It was never recorded from open forest and usually avoids secondary forest and plantations (coffee, eucalyptus, Pinus elliottii and Pinus patula), though if the canopy cover is dense enough it may utilize plantations and secondary rainforest as corridors to move between patches of prime habitat (Venturini et al. 2005).

The cherry-throated tanager moves through its habitat singly, in pairs (especially during breeding season) or in small flocks led by a dominant bird. If undisturbed, it utilizes regular "tracks" to visit feeding sites over the course of the day; these tracks vary according to season. It is apparently a resident bird; there is no indication even for altitudinal migrations. The species, like many tanagers, joins mixed-species feeding flocks. Those in which N. rourei was observed to participate were usually led by Sirystes and contained chestnut-crowned becards and rufous-headed tanagers as "core" species. The food of adult birds at least seems to consist entirely or nearly entirely of small invertebrates such as caterpillars, butterflies, ants, and other arthropods; Eucalyptus flowers are visited though it is not clear whether to feed on nectar or on nectar-feeding insects. Food is taken by gleaning and clambering through branches to look under leaves as typical for tanagers (Isler & Isler 1987); the birds do not hang down from branches like titmice (Bauer et al. 2000, Venturini et al. 2005).

A golden-chevroned tanager was once observed to dominate over a cherry-throated tanager individual, and a black-necked aracari was seen to attack the species for purposes unknown. There exists an observation of an apparent intraspecific threat pose, in which the head and neck are extended and held horizontally, and the wings are half-spread (Venturini et al. 2005).

Longevity is unknown, but not presumed to differ from roughly one decade common among mid-sized passerines. The single ringed bird is known to have lived for at least 6 years (Venturini et al. 2005).

Reproduction
No good data exists, but apparent courtship activity was observed in October (Venturini et al. 2005), and birds were observed to collect nest-building material in November (Venturini et al. 2002). What seems to be young birds close to independence but still accompanied by their parents were observed in late February (Bauer et al. 2000). Considering the usual time from egg-laying to fledging is 2–3 weeks in tropical tanagers (Isler & Isler 1987), this would seem to fit rather well with the main nesting season being in December/January, just as in most tanager species with similar ecology.

Status
This bird has been classified as critically endangered by BirdLife International, with an estimated population of between 30 and 200 adult birds and a distribution size of just . From field data, presently only some 14-20 individuals are known, some of them juvenile, but the continuing existence of this very rare bird for over 100 years suggests further populations await discovery. The major threat to its survival is deforestation leading to further and further habitat fragmentation and which can reduce habitat to a point where it is too small in extent for a viable population of this species. As with many Atlantic Forest endemics, it seems to have been a rare bird even before the onset of widespread habitat destruction, but why this is so remains unknown.

Though there is an ongoing effort to provide legal protection for Fazenda Pindobas IV as a Reserva Particular do Patrimônio Natural (Private Natural Heritage Reserve), and at present, the birds there and at Caetés Forest seem safe as logging activity is stalled. Due to its somewhat predictable movements and the readiness with which this attractive species can be enticed into visual range, the cherry-throated tanager may become a significant attraction for ecotourism and/or serve as a flagship species for protection of lesser-known Atlantic Forest endemics. On the other hand, the birds are somewhat sensitive to disturbance: following a motor rally that (illegally) crossed Fazenda Pindobas IV, the birds avoided the area disturbed by the vehicles' crossing for some time (Venturini et al. 2005).

References

 Bauer, Claudia; Pacheco, José Fernando; Venturini, Ana Cristina; de Paz, Pedro Rogerio; Rehen, M.P. & do Carmo, L.P. (1998): O primeiro registro documentado do séc. XX da saíra-apunhalada, Nemosia rourei Cabanis, 1870, uma espécie enigmática do sudeste do Brasil. Atualidades Ornitológicas 82: 6. [Article in Portuguese] HTML abstract
 Bauer, Claudia; Pacheco, José Fernando; Venturini, Ana Cristina & Whitney, Bret M. (2000): Rediscovery of the Cherry-throated Tanager Nemosia rourei in southern Espírito Santo, Brazil. Bird Conservation International 10(2): 97–108.  (HTML abstract)
 BirdLife International (2007): Species factsheet: Nemosia rourei. Retrieved 2007-JUL-27.
 Cabanis, Jean (1870): Ueber eine neue brasilische Nemosie oder Wald-Tangare, Nemosia Rourei nov. spec. J. Ornithol. 18(6): 459–460. [Article in German] 
 Isler, Morton L. & Isler, Phyllis R. (1987): Tanagers. Christopher Helm, London. .
 Pacheco, José Fernando (1998): Cherry-throated Tanager Nemosia rourei rediscovered. Cotinga 9: 41.
 Pacheco, José Fernando (1999): É de Minas Gerais o exemplar único e original de Nemosia rourei? Atualidades Ornitológicas 89: 7. [Article in Portuguese]
 Pacheco, José Fernando & Bauer, Claudia (1995): Adolf Schneider (1881–1946): Alguns dados sobre a vida e obra do chefe da expedição de 1939 do Museu de Ciências Naturais de Berlim que trouxe Helmut Sick para o Brasil. Atualidades Ornitológicas 65: 10–13. [Article in Portuguese]
 Scott, Derek A. (1997): A possible re-sighting of the Cherry-throated Tanager Nemosia rourei in Espírito Santo, Brazil. Cotinga 7: 61–63.
 Sibley, Charles Gald (1996): Birds of the world, Version 2.0. Thayer Birding Software, Naples, Florida.
 Sick, Helmut (1979): Notes on some Brazilian birds. Bull. B.O.C. 99(4): 115–120.
 Venturini, Ana Cristina; de Paz, Pedro Rogerio & Kirwan, Guy M. (2002): First breeding data for Cherry-throated Tanager Nemosia rourei. Cotinga 17: 42–45.
 Venturini, Ana Cristina; de Paz, Pedro Rogerio & Kirwan, Guy M. (2005): A new locality and records of Cherry-throated Tanager Nemosia rourei in Espírito Santo, south-east Brazil, with fresh natural history data for the species. Cotinga 24': 60–70.

External links
 SAVE Brazil (BirdLife Brazil): Fazenda Pindobas IV project page. Retrieved 2007-JUL-28. Contains another photo of a Cherry-throated Tanager.
 

cherry-throated tanager
Birds of the Atlantic Forest
Endemic birds of Brazil
Critically endangered animals
Critically endangered biota of South America
cherry-throated tanager